Keeping chickens is becoming increasingly popular in urban and suburban areas. The reasons for keeping chickens are as pets, for eggs, for meat, or for eating pests. Some people will sell the eggs for side income.

Keeping chickens in an urban environment is a type of urban agriculture, important in the local food movement, which is the growing  practice of cultivating, processing and distributing food in or around a village, town or city.  According to National Sustainable Agriculture Information Service and experts in backyard agriculture, there are a host of personal benefits associated with urban agriculture and keeping chickens in one's own backyard.

History
Keeping livestock in cities has been common throughout history and is still practiced in many parts of the world. For example, 50,000 pigs were being kept in Manhattan in 1859. But local ordinances were created to limit this, owing to the noise and smell nuisance, and these were relaxed only in times of war when the urban populace was encouraged to provide food for itself.

Urban relief gardens played an important role in sustaining large populations of Americans during economic depressions.  War gardens played an important role in the nationwide effort to help win both World War I and World War II. Backyard chickens have become a common practice in the United States.  These victory gardens made gardening a patriotic activity and introduced gardening as an activity for everyone, not just those too poor to buy their own food.  Later, in the late 1960s and 1970s, community gardening started to make a comeback as a hobby. Organic gardening, urban animal husbandry, and community farms became popular and many cities around the country started community gardening programs for their residents.

Revival
In Canada and the United States, the raising of chickens on urban, suburban, and small town residential lots has become increasingly popular. For example, in Madison, Wisconsin, citizens formed a group called the Chicken Underground, overturned a ban upon domestic chickens and there are now 81 registered owners.  A film titled Mad City Chickens was made about their campaign. More and more cities that had previously banned urban chickens are removing old regulations or making permits easier to obtain.

Policies toward keeping chickens vary by country, county, or city. Other cities with urban chicken programs and activists include Halifax, New York City, Portland, Oregon, Seattle and Vancouver.

In the UK, the keeping of chickens has also grown in popularity with as many as 200,000 households involved.  Sales of the fashionable Eglu hen house increased ten-fold between 2004 and 2009.

Commercial vs. backyard egg production
Commercial egg production has been associated with salmonella and other disease outbreaks in the United States. Poor sanitation and crowded hen houses have contributed to these problems. Expansion of the poultry industry, fueled by an increased demand for poultry products, has created a demand for high throughout poultry and egg production. The resulting increased poultry population density and the rearing  of incompatible poultry species in close proximity have presented major disease challenges.  Studies have shown that small scale, backyard chicken keeping/egg production reduces these potential disease risks. Historically, avian infectious diseases were not appreciated for their ability to influence populations and were relatively neglected for their part in causing species declines.

According to Mench et al., although changes in commercial egg production systems are being driven largely by animal welfare concerns, it is clear that other aspects of such changes must be considered to ensure sustainable egg production. Sustainability is a complex topic. Elements of sustainability include economics, environmental effects, human health and safety, and social values in addition to animal welfare. Backyard egg production has been suggested as a solution to sustainable, healthy food supply for families.

Breeds 
While there are over 300 different breeds of chickens, most people choose between a select few breeds. Most chicken owners are looking for a high-producing egg layer, cold- and heat-hardy, docile, quiet, non-broody, and aesthetically pleasing chicken breed. Many commercial chickens raised in factories for white eggs are white leghorns. This breed is noisy, but has a very high production of eggs and rarely go broody, and they are not very docile, cold-hardy or aesthetically pleasing. Urban chicken owners often choose a red-sex link hybrid similar to production brown-egg producers (Isa Browns, HyLine Browns), another hybrid among the Red and Black Sex-links, or chickens known as "heritage breeds," including the Rhode Island Red, Barred Rocks, Buff Orpingtons, Brahmas, Wyandottes, etc. These breeds generally fit more of the categories that urban chicken owners are looking for.

Meat chickens are different than egg-laying chickens for urban chicken owners. Chicks sold specifically as meat chickens are sometimes called broiler chickens. As with egg-laying breeds, there is a variety of meat chicken breeds. These chickens are butcher-ready in a short time period after hatching. Some breeds grow to full size in as little as 5 weeks. Other breeds grow for up to 12–14 weeks until the butcher date. Meat chickens provide urban chicken owners the ability to know where their meat is coming from, and how it was raised.

Egg-laying chickens include the two groups, Bantams and Standards. Often raised as pets, Bantams are the smaller variety of chickens that require less space and feed. These smaller chickens provide smaller eggs, but still produce a large quantity of eggs. Standards range from heavy to light breeds and produce the average sized eggs.

Chick care

Purchasing chickens 
Chicken owners need to find a place to purchase chickens. Oftentimes, people purchase chickens at local feed stores, or through a hatchery.

Creating a brooder 
Chickens not being raised by a mother hen need assistance from their owner to survive. Chickens are raised in a brooder, which can look like a variety of things. Many individuals create their own brooder out of cardboard, plastic or wood. Different sources identify a variety of different square feet per bird needed, but a rule of thumb can be two square feet per chicken. This number can be lowered when the chick is young, but as they grow they will need at least two square feet per bird. It is important that chicken owners place their brooder in a draft-free place, yet still allow holes in the brooder for ventilation.

Heating and bedding 
Chicks require a warm environment. In a brooder, this warm environment is created artificially with a heat lamp. My Pet Chicken recommends a red heat lamp, because a white heat lamp can create a harsh and uncomfortable environment for the baby chicks. During the first week of the chicks' life, a temperature of 95 degrees Fahrenheit is required. The temperature can be decreased by 5 degrees F. each week of the chicks life, until they reach week 6. At week 6, the birds should have enough feathers grown to be moved into their chicken coop. Checking on chicks often is important, as chicks that are too cold will huddle together to attempt to retain warmth, and chicks that are too hot will spread out in the brooder in attempts to cool down. Temperature can be adjusted accordingly by lowering and raising the heat lamp in the chick's brooder. Temperature can also be monitored by the use of a thermometer. Wooden chips are often used in the bottom of the brooder as a bedding.

Food and water 
Chicks require different food than adult chickens. Chicks need a mash or dust food so that they are able to digest it without grit. Adult chickens are able to digest grit, which allows them to eat bigger food pellets. Purchasing chick food from a local feed store that is specifically for baby chicks will ensure that all nutritional requirements are being met. There are different types of food for different types of chicks. Chicks that are grown for egg-laying purposes require a lower protein level than chicks that are grown as a source of meat. Chicks should be fed and given water out of containers that ensure the chicks' safety, as some containers can injure the chicks or cause easy drowning.

Concerns
There are some common concerns associated with the practice of raising chickens in residential areas, specifically noise, odor, attraction of predators/pests, property values, and health. Most chicken owners say that these myths and misconceptions about chickens and their behavior are central to issues surrounding passage of city ordinances and regulations necessary for the keeping of urban chickens:

Health
Bird flu and salmonella are the two biggest concerns to human health. The risk for catching bird flu is low, according to Mark Slifka, Ph. D. Infectious Disease Expert with Oregon Health & Science University in Portland, OR. He states this is especially true if the hens are kept in a closed environment, since they wouldn't be exposed to other birds.

Salmonella is mostly associated with under-cooked chicken meat. People who have weak immune systems, such as the elderly, young children, and those with various medical conditions, are most at risk. Proper sanitation and cooking practices lessen the threat of contracting salmonellosis. Chicken feces can also infect water sources with Salmonella. If chickens are kept an adequate distance from water sources, the risk of contaminated water sources from chicken feces is significantly reduced.
Avian influenza, commonly referred to as "bird flu" is spread through contact with the feces of contaminated migratory birds. Since these infected wild birds are currently only in Asia, Africa, and Eastern Europe, there is no possible chance of it spreading to chickens elsewhere.

Noise
In some areas, roosters are banned, and only hens are allowed, and in limited numbers, to prevent problems with noise. Hens are relatively quiet as compared to pet dogs, though hens often vocalize after an egg is laid for a few minutes. The noise level during this squawking period has been measured at around 63 decibels, or about the level of two people talking.

In Columbia, South Carolina it was argued that leaf blowers were far louder than chickens, that dogs produce more waste than chickens do, so neither of those concerns were a valid reason to keep a ban on them. However, the average chicken defecates upwards of seventy times a day, compared with a dog's two or three times a day, calling into question the veracity of that argument.
In 1926 in Oakland, California, the department of public health and safety issued an order to "put your roosters in a light[-]proof coop, or devise apparatus that will hold the rooster's head down so he can't crow" in response to complaints about the noise they were making.

Odor
Odor concerns can be mitigated somewhat by limiting the number of chickens that a household can own. Unlike large commercial operations, where thousands of chickens are kept in close quarters and thus build up enough ammonia to create a powerful odor, small backyard operations produce proportionately less odor. Although in urban spaces where homes are situated right beside one another, steps must be taken to control odors. These range from regular cleaning to changing out the chicken's bedding. If not properly cared for, odors can become quite strong given close proximity to neighboring homes. The average chicken eliminates waste, on average, every fifteen to twenty minutes; a coop of nine chickens will produce approximately seven hundred (700) defecations per day.

Unwanted predators, pests, and rodents
Predators and rodents are already living in urban areas. Wild bird feeders, pet food, gardens, fish ponds, bird baths, trash waiting to be collected—all attract raccoons, foxes, rodents and flies. Most modern chicken pens are designed to keep predators away. Rats, however, may be attracted to a yard in which excess chicken food remains on the ground on a regular basis. Chicken owners have found many different ways of protecting chickens from predators without significant impact on the area.

Property values
One of the arguments against allowing backyard hens is that chickens kept within city limits will cause a reduction in property values. This is due in part due to the adverse affects backyard chickens can cause; be it smell or noise.

See also
Urban agriculture

References

External links

 
 

Chickens
Urban agriculture